Thorsten (Thorstein, Torstein, Torsten) is a Scandinavian given name. The Old Norse name was Þórsteinn. It is a compound of the theonym Þór (Thor) and steinn "stone", which became Thor and sten in Old Danish and Old Swedish.

The name is one of a group of Old Norse names containing the theonym Thor, besides other such as  Þórarin, Þórhall, Þórkell, Þórfinnr, Þórvald, Þórvarðr,  Þórolf, most of which, however, do not survive as modern names given with any frequency.

The name is attested in medieval Iceland, e.g. Þorsteinn rauður Ólafsson (c. 850 – 880), Þōrsteinn Eirīkssonr (late 10th century), and in literature such as  Draumr Þorsteins Síðu-Hallssonar.

The Old English equivalent of the Scandinavian and Norman name is Thurstan, attested after the Norman conquest of England in the 11th century as the name of a medieval archbishop of York (died 1140), of an abbot of Pershore (1080s) and of an abbot of Glastonbury (1090s).
The English surname Thurston is presumably derived from this given name.
The English given name Dustin is derived from a surname which in origin may have been derived in turn from the Scandinavian given name.

As a modern given name, Thorsten and Torsten also see some popularity in the English-speaking world and in German-speaking Europe.

Modern people with this name

Pre-World War I births
 Thorsten Guttormsen Fretheim (born 1808), Norwegian politician
 Thorsten Nordenfelt (1842–1920), Swedish inventor and industrialist
 Thorstein Veblen (1857–1929), Norwegian-American sociologist and economist
 Torsten Nothin (1884–1972), Swedish politician
 Thorstein John Ohnstad Fretheim (1886–1971), Norwegian politician
Thorsten Grönfors (1888–1968), Swedish sailor and tennis player
 Thorstein Johansen (1888–1963), Norwegian rifle shooter
Torsten Tegnér (1888–1977), Swedish athlete and journalist
Torstein Kvamme (1893–1985), Norwegian politician for the Christian Democratic Party
Thorsten Sellin (1896–1994), American sociologist at the University of Pennsylvania, a penologist and scientific criminologist
Torstein Børte (1899–1985), Norwegian politician for the Liberal Party
Torstein Selvik (1900–1983), Norwegian politician for the Labour Party
Thorsten Svensson (1901–1954), Swedish football (soccer) player
Torstein Olav Kuvaas (1908–1996), Norwegian politician for the Liberal Party
 Thorstein Treholt (1911–1993), Norwegian politician

1914–1945 births
Thorsten Andersson (1923–2018), Swedish toponymist
Torstein Eckhoff (1916–1993), Norwegian civil servant, professor of law at the University of Oslo
Torsten Engberg (1934–2018), Swedish Coastal Artillery lieutenant general
Þorsteinn Gylfason (1942–2005), Icelandic intellectual
Torstein Hansen (born 1943), Norwegian handball player
Torsten Lindh (1941–2020), Swedish Navy rear admiral
Torstein Moland (born 1945), Norwegian economist
Torstein Raaby (1919–1964), Norwegian telegrapher, resistance fighter and explorer
Torstein Slungård (born 1931), Norwegian politician from the Liberal Party
Torstein Tynning (1932–2000), Norwegian politician for the Conservative Party
Post-World War II births
Torstein Dahle (born 1947), Norwegian politician and economist
Torstein Rudihagen (born 1952), Norwegian politician for the Labour Party
Torstein Flakne (born 1960), the founder of the Norwegian band Stage Dolls
Thorsten Flinck (born 1961), Swedish musician
Torsten Gütschow (born 1962), German football striker
Torstein Aagaard-Nilsen (born 1964), Norwegian composer
Torsten Bréchôt (born 1964), East German judoka
Torsten Gejl (born 1964), Danish politician
Thorsten Kaye (born 1966), American-based actor
Thorsten Fink (born 1967), German football coach and former player
Thorsten Legat (born 1968), German football coach and a retired player
Thorsten Dauth (born 1968), German decathlete
Thorsten Schäfer-Gümbel (born 1969), German politician of the SPD
Torsten Amft (born 1971), German fashion designer
Thorsten Schmugge (born 1971), German footballer
Torsten Loibl (born 1972), German basketball coach
Torsten Abel (born 1974), German triathlete
Thorsten Schmitt (born 1975), German Nordic combined skier
Thorsten Leibenath (born 1975), German basketball coach and basketball player
Thorsten Wittek (born 1976), German football player
Torsten Frings (born 1976), German football midfielder
 Thorstein Helstad (born 1977), Norwegian footballer
Torstein Lofthus (born 1977), Norwegian drummer
Thorsten Quaeschning, German musician of the band Tangerine Dream
Thorsten Nehrbauer (born 1978), German footballer
Thorsten Hohmann (born 1979), German pool player
Thorsten Becker (born 1980), German footballer
Thorsten Burkhardt (born 1981), German football player
Thorsten Engelmann (born 1981), German rower
Thorsten Stuckmann (born 1981), German football player
Thorsten Barg (born 1986), German football player
Thorsten Kirschbaum (born 1987), German footballer
Torstein Horgmo (born 1987), Norwegian pro snowboarder
Torstein Andersen Aase (born 1991), Norwegian football striker
Thorsten Owusu Gyimah (born 2003), Ghanaian drill rapper known as Yaw Tog

See also
Thorstein Islands
Torsten (Andy Bell series), a series of albums, stage acts and remixes by Andy Bell
Toutain, Norman surname

References

Scandinavian masculine given names

no:Thorsten
nn:Thorsten